The Very Best of Judy Collins is a greatest hits album by singer/songwriter Judy Collins. It includes highlights of her career through 1975. All tracks are taken from her Elektra studio albums with one exception, the single version of Collins' biggest hit "Both Sides Now", which peaked at No. 8 on the Billboard singles chart.

Track listing
"Turn! Turn! Turn!" (Pete Seeger) – 3:40
"So Early, Early in the Spring" (Traditional) – 3:12
"Suzanne" (Leonard Cohen) – 4:26
"Just Like Tom Thumb's Blues" (Bob Dylan) – 5:08
"Both Sides Now" (Joni Mitchell) – 3:16
"Since You Asked" (Judy Collins) – 2:37
"Albatross" (Collins) – 4:53
"My Father" (Collins) – 5:02
"Someday Soon" (Ian Tyson) – 3:47
"Who Knows Where the Time Goes?" (Sandy Denny) – 4:47
"Chelsea Morning" (Mitchell) – 3:21
"Farewell to Tarwathie" (Traditional) – 4:58
"Song for Judith (Open the Door)" (Collins) – 4:07
"Cook with Honey" (Valerie Carter) – 3:31
"Send in the Clowns" (Stephen Sondheim) – 4:03
"Amazing Grace" (John Newton) – 4:06

References

2001 greatest hits albums
Judy Collins albums
Rhino Entertainment compilation albums
Elektra Records compilation albums